State Road 237 (NM 237) is a  state highway in the U.S. state of New Mexico. Its western terminus is at Interstate 40 Business (I-40 Bus.) in Tucumcari, and the eastern terminus is at U.S. Route 54 (US 54), also in Tucumcari. It also provides the routing for Business Loop US 54.

History
NM 237 is the former routing of US 54, before US 54 was extended further east along Interstate 40 (I-40) from exit 329 to exit 333.

Major intersections

See also

References

237
Transportation in Quay County, New Mexico
Tucumcari, New Mexico
U.S. Route 54